Bolelli is an Italian surname. Notable people with the surname include:

Simone Bolelli (born 1985), Italian tennis player
Franco Bolelli (born 1950), Italian philosopher
Daniele Bolelli (born 1974), Italian writer and martial artist, son of Franco Bolelli

Italian-language surnames